Peppercorn is the fruit of black pepper.

Peppercorn may also refer to:

Plants
Peppercorn tree
Sichuan peppercorn

Legal
 Peppercorn (legal), a very small payment used to satisfy the requirements for the creation of a legal contract

People
 Arthur Peppercorn (1889–1951), English mechanical engineer
 Arthur Douglas Peppercorn (1847–1926), English landscape painter
 David Peppercorn (born 1931), British Master of Wine and author

See also
 LNER Peppercorn Class A1
 LNER Peppercorn Class A2
 Pepper (disambiguation)